Eucalyptus saligna, commonly known as the Sydney blue gum or blue gum, is a species of medium-sized to tall tree that is endemic to eastern Australia. It has rough, flaky bark near the base of the trunk, smooth bark above, lance-shaped to curved adult leaves, flower buds in groups of seven, nine or eleven, white flowers and cylindrical to conical or cup-shaped fruit.

Description
Flowering occurs from December to March and the flowers are white.

Taxonomy and naming
Eucalyptus saligna was first formally described in 1797 by English naturalist James Edward Smith in Transactions of the Linnean Society of London, and still bears its original name. The species name saligna refers to some likeness to a willow, though what attribute this is, is unclear. It has been classified in the subgenus Symphyomyrtus, Section Latoangulatae, Series Transversae (eastern blue gums) by Ian Brooker and David Kleinig. Its two closest relatives are the flooded gum (E. grandis) and the mountain blue gum (E. deanei).

Distribution and habitat
Sydney blue gum is generally found within  of the coastline in its range from Sydney to Maryborough in central Queensland. To the northwest, it is found in disjunct populations in central Queensland, including in Eungella National Park, Kroombit Tops, Consuelo Tableland, Blackdown Tableland and Carnarvon Gorge. It grows in tall forests in more sheltered areas, on clay or loam soils, and alluvial sands. It is a component of the endangered blue gum high forest ecological community in the Sydney region. Populations found south of Sydney are now not considered to be E. saligna.

Associated trees include blackbutt (E. pilularis), grey ironbark (E. paniculata), mountain blue gum (E. deanei), flooded gum (E. grandis), tallowwood (E. microcorys), thin-leaved stringybark (E. eugenioides), manna gum (E. viminalis), river peppermint (E. elata), grey gums (E. punctata and E. propinqua ), rough-barked apple (Angophora floribunda), spotted gum (Corymbia maculata), turpentine (Syncarpia glomulifera), brush box (Lophostemon confertus) and forest oak (Allocasuarina torulosa).

South of Sydney Harbour and the Parramatta River, pure stands of E. saligna give way to hybrid populations with bangalay (E. botryoides).

Ecology
Eucalyptus saligna regenerates by regrowing from epicormic buds on the trunk and lower branches after bushfire. Trees live for over two hundred years. The grey-headed flying fox (Pteropus poliocephalus) eats the flowers, the koala (Phascalarctos cinereus) eats the leaves, and crimson rosella (Platycercus elegans) eats the seed. The longhorn beetle species Paroplites australis, Agrianome spinicollis and Tessaromma undatum have been recorded from the Sydney blue gum.

The presence of the territorial and aggressive bell miner (Manorina melanophrys) and psyllid insects (Glycaspis)  is correlated with dieback of the canopy of E. saligna, a syndrome which has been termed bell-miner-associated dieback (BMAD), though the exact mechanism remains unclear. After colonization by Glycaspis, E. salinga may then be infested by the ambrosia beetle Amasa truncata.

Uses
The wood of this species is heavy (about 850 kg/m3), fairly hard, coarse, even textured
and reasonably easy to work. It is used for general building construction, panelling, and boat-building, and is highly prized for flooring and furniture because of its rich dark honey colour.

References
 

saligna
Trees of Australia
Myrtales of Australia
Flora of New South Wales
Flora of Queensland
Plants described in 1797